Cristovam Roberto Ribeiro da Silva (born 25 July 1990), simply known as Cristovam, is a Brazilian footballer who plays as a right back for Criciúma.

Club career
On 27 June 2013, FK Senica signed Cristovam together with his teammate Hiago on one-year loan with option to buy from Brazilian club Arapongas. He made his debut for FK Senica on 13 July 2013 against FC Spartak Trnava, Senica defeated Spartak Trnava 2-1. On 29 December 2017, Cristovam joined K League 1 club Suwon Samsung Bluewings.

Cristovam joined Ceará for the 2019 season.

Honours
CSA
Campeonato Alagoano: 2021

References

External links
Corgoň Liga Profile

1990 births
Living people
People from Feira de Santana
Brazilian footballers
Association football fullbacks
Campeonato Brasileiro Série A players
Campeonato Brasileiro Série B players
Campeonato Brasileiro Série C players
Campeonato Brasileiro Série D players
Guaratinguetá Futebol players
Sport Club Corinthians Paulista players
Associação Atlética Flamengo players
Londrina Esporte Clube players
J. Malucelli Futebol players
Paraná Clube players
Ceará Sporting Club players
Guarani FC players
Centro Sportivo Alagoano players
São Bernardo Futebol Clube players
Criciúma Esporte Clube players
Slovak Super Liga players
FK Senica players
K League 1 players
Suwon Samsung Bluewings players
Brazilian expatriate footballers
Brazilian expatriate sportspeople in Slovakia
Brazilian expatriate sportspeople in South Korea
Expatriate footballers in Slovakia
Expatriate footballers in South Korea
Sportspeople from Bahia